Lukáš Plšek (born 15 September 1983) is a Czech former ice hockey goaltender.

Plšek began his career with HC Vsetín playing in the under-18 and under-20 league before moving to the full squad. He spent six seasons with Vsetín, where he was mostly a backup goalie, only playing 21 games in total. He also played for various second tier teams in aid of development. In 2005 he moved to Zlín but only played four games for them as once again he was sent to the second liga for development.

In 2006, Plšek moved to Denmark to join IK Aarhus and in 2007 he joined AaB Ishockey where he served as backup to Peter Hirsch.  He returned to Vsetín in 2008 and played for the team till 2016.

External links

1983 births
Living people
AaB Ishockey players
Czech ice hockey goaltenders
LHK Jestřábi Prostějov players
Hokej Šumperk 2003 players
People from Uničov
VHK Vsetín players
PSG Berani Zlín players
Sportspeople from the Olomouc Region
Czech expatriate sportspeople in Denmark
Czech expatriate ice hockey people
Expatriate ice hockey players in Denmark